San Diego Academy is a private, coeducational K-12 Christian school in National City, California.

It is a part of the Seventh-day Adventist education system, the world's second largest Christian school system. As set forth in its constitution and bylaws, San Diego Academy is governed by a Board of Trustees composed of pastors and elected lay people of the constituent Seventh-day Adventist churches, parents, and alumni. The school operates under the auspices of the Southeastern California Conference of Seventh-day Adventists Office of Education.

San Diego Academy provides Christian education for K-12 young people in the Seventh-day Adventist churches located in the greater San Diego metropolitan area. The churches represented on the Board of Trustees are constituent members of the school and support it by giving an amount equal to 10.5% of their tithe income each year. Churches encourage each child in their church to attend. Some churches give added assistance to worthy families to make it financially possible for their students to attend.

History
San Diego Academy had its beginnings in 1899 when W. M. Healey, pastor of the Adventist church, rented a store at 17th and K Streets. Seventeen students began their Christian education with Robert Sanders and his wife serving as teachers. The school functioned as an elementary school and then a junior academy until 1930 when it became a full 12-grade school.

After a series of moves, the school was located adjacent to the then-church owned Paradise Valley Hospital in 1947.

Construction on the new site, just east of the old one, began in 2002. The new facility was completed and classes began in 2800 East 4th Street facility during August 2005.

Academics
The required curriculum includes classes in the following subject areas: Religion, English, Oral Communications, Social Studies, Mathematics, Science, Physical Education, Health, Computer Applications, Fine Arts, and electives. Advanced classes include AP Chemistry, AP Physics, AP Calculus and AP English.

The school's musical program includes instrumental and vocal courses such as 5-6 grade band, 7-8 grade band, and high school concert band. The choral program includes a 7-8 grade choir, a high school choir, and a select choral ensemble. Additionally, there is a handbell choir with at least 14 members.

Spiritual aspects
All students take religion classes each year that they are enrolled. These classes cover topics in biblical history and Christian and denominational doctrines. Instructors in other disciplines also begin each class period with prayer or a short devotional thought, many which encourage student input. Weekly, the entire student body gathers together in the auditorium for an hour-long chapel service.
Outside the classrooms there is year-round spiritually oriented programming that relies on student involvement.

Elementary
San Diego Academy Elementary, includes kindergarten through sixth grade.

Junior high school
San Diego Academy Junior High comprises seventh and eighth grades.

High school
San Diego Academy High School, includes ninth through twelfth grades.

Sports
All students in K-12 are required to take physical education. In the high school level, students are required to play sports or take a PE class until they have two years worth of PE credits.

The high school sports program has teams on both the men's and women's junior varsity and varsity level. The varsity program includes men's and women's basketball, men's and women's volleyball, and co-ed soccer. The junior varsity program includes, men's and women's flag football, men's basketball, and men's volleyball. These teams play in the CIF Southern Section, with the exception of flag football, which is played in a league of other Adventist schools.

In the junior high level, the sports program includes, boys' flag football, boys' soccer, girls' volleyball, and boys' and girls' basketball.

See also

 List of Seventh-day Adventist secondary schools
 Seventh-day Adventist education

References

External links
 

Christian schools in California
Private elementary schools in California
Private middle schools in California
Educational institutions established in 1899
High schools in San Diego County, California
Adventist secondary schools in the United States
Private high schools in California
1899 establishments in California